The 1942 Glasgow Cathcart by-election was held on 29 April 1942.  The by-election was held due to the death of the incumbent Conservative MP, John Train.  It was won by the Conservative candidate Francis Beattie.

References

1942 in Scotland
1940s elections in Scotland
1942 elections in the United Kingdom
By-elections to the Parliament of the United Kingdom in Glasgow constituencies
1940s in Glasgow